Jeanne de Casalis (22 May 1897 – 19 August 1966) was a Basutoland-born British actress of stage, radio, TV and film.

Born in Basutoland as Jeanne Casalis de Pury, she was educated in France, where her businessman father was the proprietor of one of that country's largest corset retailers, Charneaux. She initiated her career in music first, only later beginning to work onstage in London. She appeared on stage in The Mask of Virtue with Vivien Leigh (1935), and in Agatha Christie's The Hollow (1951). On radio, she created the popular comic character 'Mrs. Feather' and also authored Mrs Feather's Diary (1936) based on her monologues. Her best-known films were Cottage to Let (1941) and Jamaica Inn (1939).

She married English actor Colin Clive, best remembered for Frankenstein (1931), in June 1929, though they were estranged for several years before his death on 25 June 1937 from tuberculosis. Her second husband, whom she married around 1938, was RAF Wing Commander Cowan Douglas Stephenson; they lived at Hunger Hatch near Ashford, Kent. Jeanne de Casalis died on 19 August 1966, aged 69.

Partial filmography
Settled Out of Court (1925) .... The Wife
The Glad Eye (1927) .... Lucienne
The Arcadians (1927) .... Mrs. Smith
Zero (1928) .... Julia Norton
Knowing Men (1930) .... Delphine
Infatuation (1930, Short) .... Georgette
Nine Till Six (1932) .... Yvonne
Radio Parade (1933) .... Mrs. Feather
Mixed Doubles (1933) .... Betty Irvine
Nell Gwynn (1934) .... Duchess of Portsmouth
Just like a Woman (1938) .... Poppy Mayne
Jamaica Inn (1939) .... Sir Humphrey's friend 
The Girl Who Forgot (1940) .... Mrs. Barradine
Charley's (Big-Hearted) Aunt (1940) .... Lady Lucy Blessington-Smythe (Aunt Lucy)
Sailors Three (1940) .... Mrs Pilkington
Cottage to Let (1941) .... Mrs. Barrington
Those Kids from Town (1942) .... Sheila
They Met in the Dark (1943) .... Lady with Dog
Medal for the General (1944) .... Lady Frome
This Man Is Mine (1946) .... Mrs. Ferguson
The Turners of Prospect Road (1947) .... Mrs. Webster
Woman Hater (1948) .... Clair

References

External links

1897 births
1966 deaths
British film actresses
British radio actresses
British stage actresses
20th-century British actresses
British people of French descent
British expatriates in Lesotho
British expatriates in France